Southern Alamance High School is a public, coeducational high school located in Graham, North Carolina. It is one of seven high schools in the Alamance-Burlington School System.

History 
The former Alamance County high schools of Alexander Wilson, Sylvan, E. M. Holt, and Eli Whitney, were consolidated into a new high school; Southern Alamance High School.  A school bond passed in 1958 to finance the consolidation. Opening day of Southern Alamance High was December 12, 1960.

Athletics 
Southern Alamance High School sports teams are known as the Patriots. The school is a member of the North Carolina High School Athletic Association (NCHSAA). As of the 2021–2022 school year, Southern Alamance competes in the DAC-VII 4A Conference.

Clubs 
Southern Alamance has a wide array of clubs for students to join. Each year, student council puts on events such as homecoming, holiday cheer, coming home, and many others.

References 

 Alamance County Register of Deeds 

Public high schools in North Carolina
Schools in Alamance County, North Carolina